Beth Nolan (born August 21, 1951 in New York City) was vice president and general counsel of
the George Washington University.  She was also Bill Clinton's final White House Counsel, as well as the first woman to hold the office.  Prior to serving as White House Counsel, Nolan worked in other White House and Department of Justice positions, taught law, and worked in private practice.

Personal
Nolan was born in New York City, and received her Bachelor of Arts degree at Scripps College in 1973. Nolan earned her Juris Doctor from  Georgetown University Law Center, graduating magna cum laude in 1980. While studying at Georgetown, she was Editor in Chief of the Georgetown Law Journal. She was admitted to the District of Columbia Bar in 1981.

Career
Nolan began her career in 1980, where she clerked  for Collins J. Seitz, a judge on the Third Circuit Court of Appeals, until 1981. From 1981 to 1985, Nolan served as a staff attorney under then Assistant Attorney General of the United States, Theodore Olsen. From 1985 to 1993, Nolan taught at George Washington University Law School, earning tenure in 1992. At Georgetown, she taught constitutional law, government ethics, and professional responsibility. Nolan was also a professor at George Washington University Law School during the 1995-1996 school year.

Nolan began working in the White house as Associate White House Counsel, serving from 1993 to 1995. From 1996 to 1999, she served as Deputy Assistant Attorney General in the Office of Legal Counsel.

In 1997, Nolan became the nominee to serve as Assistant Attorney General of the United States for Office of Legal Counsel, although the Senate never voted on the nomination.

From 1999 to 2001, Nolan served as White House Counsel, serving until Bill Clinton left office in January 2001.

After leaving the White House, Nolan became a fellow at the Kennedy School of Government Institute of Politics.

In 2002, Nolan became a partner at Crowell & Moring. Nolan left the firm in 2007.

From 2007 until 2021, Nolan was Vice President and General Counsel of George Washington University.

Other
She testified on March 5, 2001 before the House Government Reform Committee that Bill Clinton's pardon of
Marc Rich did not advance President Clinton's financial interests, but that she had personally opposed it.<ref
name="Time.com" />

President Clinton nominated her in 1997 to be Assistant Attorney General of the United States for the Office of Legal Counsel, but the United States Senate did not confirm her.  Along with
Webster Hubbell and Vince Foster, she had helped Ira Magaziner prepare an affidavit explaining why he
was not required to reveal who had participated in the formulation of the failed 1993 Clinton health care plan.
United States District Court judge Royce Lamberth called the affidavit a lie, although an appellate court
held Magaziner had acted in good faith - after her nomination had failed.

Her appointment on August 10, 1999 as White House Counsel did not require Senate confirmation, and she began in September.

During its investigations of the 1996 United States campaign finance controversy, Monica Lewinsky scandal, White House FBI files controversy, and White House travel office controversy the United States House Committee on Oversight and Government Reform subpoenaed White House email traffic.  In March 2000 White House contractors testified that the email previously produced in response to these subpoenas had omitted probably thousands of responsive emails.  Technical employees had discovered in June 1998 that the automated records management system had incorrectly scanned and logged the emails, possibly since 1994.  The testified further that White House staff had cautioned them against disclosing this problem to anyone, on pain of dismissal or even prosecution.  White House Counsel Nolan testified (March 2000) before the committee and a skeptical chairman Dan Burton that it would take Northrop Grumman contract personal 6 months to restore the data.  She also said that to the best of her knowledge she knew of no evidence that anyone in the White House had attempted to conceal this noncompliance, nor that she or her office had been told of allegations of threats.

After working in the White House, Nolan became a partner with the law firm Crowell & Moring in the firm's white collar and securities litigation group. She had a broad-based federal and international practice focuses on strategic counseling, congressional investigations, internal investigations and compliance, government and legal ethics, federal election law, constitutional and public policy issues, international claims, and other matters.

In February 2006 she published a letter to members of the United States Congress, signed jointly with several legal scholars former government officials arguing that an NSA electronic surveillance program was unlawful.

Nolan argued in March 2007 that the Bush administration's assertions of executive privilege were excessive in the matter of the Dismissal of U.S. attorneys controversy, both in an op-ed article for The Washington Post and before Linda Sánchez and the House Judiciary Committee's Subcommittee on Commercial and Administrative Law during their Hearing on "Ensuring
Executive Branch Accountability".  She said the administration might lose such a claim. At George Washington University law school she had taught constitutional law.

In 2007 she represented, along with a great many others, Blackwater Worldwide a private military company.
Following the Blackwater Baghdad shootings, Henry Waxman's House Oversight Committee subpoenaed its chief executive officer Erik Prince to testify.  The climate of opinion among politicians and the public at large jeopardized its contracts to
provide security for State Department personnel in Iraq.

During the 2008 presidential election she contributed the maximum allowed to the Hillary Clinton campaign.  She has also been a contributor to Wesley Clark, Emily's List and John Kerry.

Memberships and recognition
Board of Directors of the Lawyers' Committee for Civil Rights Under Law
Board of Directors of the Arthritis Foundation of the National Capital Area
Board of Advisors of the Harvard Law & Policy Review
National Commission on Judicial Discipline and Removal (1993)
Best Lawyers in America 2008
Washington Super Lawyers 2008

Writings
Nolan, Beth. Removing Conflicts from the Administration of Justice: Conflicts of Interest and Independent Counsels under the Ethics in Government Act, 79 GEO. L.J. 1 (1990). K7 .E645
Nolan, Beth. The Role of Judicial Ethics in the Discipline and Removal of Federal Judges.

Notes

References
 Los Angeles Times, August 20, 1999.
 New York Times, August 20, 1999.
 Washington Post, January 29, 1998; June 8, 1998.
 CNN Interactive, http://cnn.com, (August 18, 1999).
 George Washington University website, http://www.law.gwu.edu
 United States House of Representatives website, http://www.house.gov, (January 9, 1998).

1951 births
American academic administrators
American legal scholars
American women lawyers
Clinton administration personnel
New York (state) Democrats
George Washington University Law School faculty
Georgetown University Law Center alumni
Living people
Lawyers from New York City
Scripps College alumni
United States Assistant Attorneys General for the Office of Legal Counsel
United States Department of Justice lawyers
Washington, D.C., Democrats
Lawyers from Washington, D.C.
White House Counsels
Women academic administrators
American women legal scholars
21st-century American women